The 1993–94 ECHL season was the sixth season of the ECHL.  In 1993, the league saw the Roanoke Valley Rampage move to Huntsville, AL becoming the Huntsville Blast, as well as an expansion to three new markets: Charlotte, NC, North Charleston, SC, and Huntington, WV and returned to the Roanoke Valley with the Roanoke Express.  The 19 teams played 68 games in the schedule.  The Knoxville Cherokees finished first overall in the regular season.  The Toledo Storm won their second straight Riley Cup Championship.

League realignment
The league announced a realignment of the league by adding a third division.

East Division
Charlotte Checkers
Greensboro Monarchs
Hampton Roads Admirals
Raleigh Icecaps
Richmond Renegades
Roanoke Express
South Carolina Stingrays

North Division
Columbus Chill
Dayton Bombers
Erie Panthers
Johnstown Chiefs
Toledo Storm
Wheeling Thunderbirds

West Division
Birmingham Bulls
Huntington Blizzard
Huntsville Blast
Knoxville Cherokees
Louisville Icehawks
Nashville Knights

Regular season
Note: GP = Games played, W = Wins, L = Losses, T = Ties, Pts = Points, GF = Goals for, GA = Goals against, Green shade = Clinched playoff spot, Blue shade = Clinched division

Riley Cup playoffs

Bracket

1st round

2nd round

Semifinals

Riley Cup finals

ECHL awards

References
All stats come from Internet Hockey Database

See also
 ECHL
 ECHL All-Star Game
 Kelly Cup
 List of ECHL seasons

ECHL seasons
ECHL season